Torr Meadhonach is a hill  high at the northernmost part of the Isle of Arran in western Scotland, east of the village of Lochranza.

References

Mountains and hills of the Isle of Arran